Ferdinando Teruzzi (17 February 1924 – 9 April 2014) was an Italian racing cyclist and Olympic champion in track cycling. He won a gold medal in the tandem event (with Renato Perona) at the 1948 Summer Olympics in London.

References

External links
 
 
 
 
 
 

1924 births
2014 deaths
Italian male cyclists
Olympic gold medalists for Italy
Cyclists at the 1948 Summer Olympics
Olympic cyclists of Italy
Italian track cyclists
People from Sesto San Giovanni
Olympic medalists in cycling
Medalists at the 1948 Summer Olympics
Cyclists from the Metropolitan City of Milan